Leo Hickey (born 1939) is an Irish retired Gaelic footballer who played for club side Ballyboughal and at inter-county level with the Dublin senior football team.

Career

Hickey first came to prominence in 1961 with the Final League selection in the Dublin County Championship and was full-back on that year's Dublin junior team. Shortly after this he was named full-back on the Dublin senior team for an O'Byrne Cup game against Longford. Hickey won back-to-back Leinster Championship medals in 1962 and 1963, and was in the Dublin inter-county side that won the 1963 All-Ireland final against Galway.

Honours

Dublin
All-Ireland Senior Football Championship: 1963
Leinster Senior Football Championship: 1962, 1963

References

1939 births
Living people
Dublin inter-county Gaelic footballers